Ades is a surname. Notable people with the surname include:

 Jean-Claude Ades (21st century), German electronic music producer
 Joe Ades, NYC street hawker of carrot peelers
 Ovadiah Josiah Ades, co-financier of the Ades Synagogue
 Steven Ades, English cricketer
 Yosef Isaac Ades, co-financier of the Ades Synagogue

See also 
 Dawn Adès, British art historian
 Thomas Adès, British composer
 Timothy Adès, British poet

References